Frankham is a surname. Notable people with the surname include:

 David Frankham (born 1926), English film and television actor
 Harold Frankham (1911–1996), English Anglican priest
 Johnny Frankham (born 1948), English boxer